S. P. Singh may refer to:

 S. P. Singh (biochemist) (born 1948), professor of biochemistry
 S. P. Singh (jurist), Indian legal educational administrator